Samuel L. Smith (born June 4, 2004) is an American professional stock car racing driver. He competes full-time in the NASCAR Xfinity Series, driving the No. 18 Toyota Supra for Joe Gibbs Racing and part-time in the NASCAR Craftsman Truck Series, driving the No. 17 Toyota Tundra for TRICON Garage. He is also a Toyota development driver.

Smith previously competed in the ARCA Menards Series and won two consecutive ARCA Menards Series East championships in 2021 and 2022. He also has competed in the CARS Tour, where he has driven for car owners Barry Nelson, Marcus Richmond, and Donnie Wilson as well as Kyle Busch Motorsports.

Racing career

Late model racing
Smith began racing at the age of 8 in go-karts, and then began racing legends cars and late models. His dad inspired him to start racing.

Smith made his debut in the CARS Tour in May 2019, driving the No. 12 Toyota for Barry Nelson. He was 14 years old at the time. He would run five more races for Nelson that year and another in 2020, before running two races in the No. 19 for Marcus Richmond. Smith returned to Nelson's team in 2021 to compete in the race at Orange County Speedway. Smith competed full-time in the CARS Series in the Super Late Model Tour in 2020, driving the No. 51 (or on occasion, the No. 51S) for Kyle Busch Motorsports. That year, he also competed in the World Series of Asphalt.

In 2021, KBM decided to temporarily close down their late model team, so Smith moved to Wilson Motorsports for his late model starts that year. He again entered the World Series of Asphalt and won the race driving the team's No. 22 car.

ARCA

On February 3, 2021, it was announced that Smith would compete in the first five races of the ARCA Menards Series East season as well as the West Series season-finale at Phoenix, all in Joe Gibbs Racing's No. 18 car. In his debut at New Smyrna, Smith would lose the race to Max Gutiérrez in a three-wide photo finish with him and Taylor Gray. Smith would then go on to win and lead the most laps in the next two races at Five Flags and the Nashville Fairgrounds. He also won the pole at Five Flags. At Dover, JGR entered Ty Gibbs (their full-time driver in the main ARCA Menards Series) in the No. 18 and moved Smith to a new second car for the team, the No. 81. (It was originally the No. 18E on the entry list, but since this race was not a combination race, numbers with letters were not allowed and the team had to change the number.) Gibbs would win that race and Smith would finish fourth. At Southern National Motorsports Park, Smith would pick up his third win of the season. While the remaining three East Series races were not on his initial schedule, Smith is expected to return to the No. 81 in those three races (at least Iowa) to hold onto the points lead and win the championship. Those three races are combination races with the main ARCA Menards Series, so Gibbs will be in the No. 18. 

Smith returned to the East Series in 2022, this time driving for Kyle Busch Motorsports. He started the season with a high note, winning the season opener race at New Smyrna, after starting from the pole and leading 167 laps. He scored another win the in following race at Five Flags, leading 107 laps. His third win of the season came at Nashville, as he once again led the most laps, with 156. Smith would also run the main ARCA Menards Series schedule full-time, but because he will not turn 18 until June 4, 2022, he would skip four races at the larger tracks, Daytona, Talladega, Kansas, and Charlotte. He earned his first main ARCA win at Berlin, leading the final 8 laps after race leader, Daniel Dye, suffered a mechanical problem. He would get a second win in the following week at Elko, dominating the race and leading 233 laps.

Xfinity Series

On June 9, 2022, it was announced that Smith would drive for eight races in the NASCAR Xfinity Series for Joe Gibbs Racing, starting at Road America. On December 6, JGR announced that Smith would drive the No. 18 full-time in 2023 with sponsorship from Pilot Flying J. 

During the 2023 season, Smith scored his first win at Phoenix; at age 18, he became the youngest Xfinity Series winner at Phoenix, and the fourth youngest winner in series history.

Craftsman Truck Series
On February 3, 2023, it was announced that Smith would make his Truck Series debut in the 2023 season-opener at Daytona, filling in for Taylor Gray in the TRICON Garage (previously David Gilliland Racing) No. 17 truck due to Gray still being 17 years old and therefore not able to race there.

Personal life
Sammy's father Kurt is good friends and an employee for Harrold Annett, father to Michael, the CEO of TMC Transportation which has sponsored him throughout his career.

Motorsports career results
(key) (Bold – Pole position awarded by qualifying time. Italics – Pole position earned by points standings or practice time. * – Most laps led.)

Stock car career summary

† As Smith was a guest driver, he was ineligible for championship points.

NASCAR
(key) (Bold – Pole position awarded by qualifying time. Italics – Pole position earned by points standings or practice time. * – Most laps led.)

Xfinity Series

Craftsman Truck Series

 Season still in progress
 Ineligible for series points

ARCA Menards Series

ARCA Menards Series East

ARCA Menards Series West

References

External links
 
 

Living people
2004 births
Racing drivers from Des Moines, Iowa
Racing drivers from Iowa
NASCAR drivers
ARCA Menards Series drivers
People from Johnston, Iowa
Joe Gibbs Racing drivers
ARCA Midwest Tour drivers
Kyle Busch Motorsports drivers